Dowagiac Woods Nature Sanctuary, commonly referred to as Dowagiac Woods, is a  woods located in Cass County, Michigan. It is maintained and preserved by the Michigan Nature Association, known as "MNA".

History 
These woods were virtually unknown even to those living nearby until 1975, when an MNA member reported that Blue-eyed Mary grew there. MNA made an appeal in 1981 for $110,000 to purchase the woods, and the campaign was completed in one year. More than 550 individual contributions were given, capped with a $20,000 grant from the Kresge Foundation.

It is now MNA’s largest sanctuary in the Lower Peninsula.

About the Sanctuary 
Plants flourish at Dowagiac Woods in countless numbers. A top attraction in Dowagiac Woods is the abundance of blue-eyed Mary, Collinsia verna. More than 150 beds can be seen from the trail, each averaging ten by twenty feet square. More than fifty species of other wildflowers bloom in the spring, and nearly fifty kinds of trees have been found at Dowagiac Woods.

Dowagiac Woods is also home to many animals, including at least 49 different kinds of birds like the yellow warbler and ruffed grouse.

References

External links 
http://www.michigannature.org.

Nature reserves in Michigan
Protected areas of Cass County, Michigan
Protected areas established in 1981
1981 establishments in Michigan